Joseph Armand Mondou (June 27, 1905 - September 13, 1976) was a Canadian ice hockey forward.

Mondou was born in Yamaska, Quebec. He played his entire National Hockey League career with the Montreal Canadiens. He made his NHL debut in 1928 and retired following the 1940 season. He went on to win two Stanley Cups with Montreal in 1930 and 1931. He was the first NHL player to attempt a penalty shot; George Hainsworth saved his attempt.

Career Statistics

Awards and achievements
Played in NHL All-Star Game (1939)

References

External links

1905 births
1976 deaths
Canadian ice hockey forwards
Ice hockey people from Quebec
Montreal Canadiens players
New Haven Eagles players
People from Montérégie
Providence Reds players
Stanley Cup champions